Give Signs is the third studio album by Australian blues musician Ash Grunwald. It was his first album recorded on his own label, Delta Groove Records and released in August 2006, peaking at number 84, becoming Grunwald's first album charting on the ARIA Charts.

At the ARIA Music Awards of 2007, the album was nominated for ARIA Award for Best Blues and Roots Album.

Track listing

Charts

Release history

References

2006 albums
Ash Grunwald albums